Jared Seth Morgenstern (born March 8, 1981) is an American designer and entrepreneur who graduated from Harvard University with a Masters and Undergraduate Degree magna cum laude in Computer Science. Shortly after graduating from Harvard, Morgenstern began working on a social networking website called Metails.com with former classmate, Eddie Lim. Lim and Morgenstern plus a team of two more employees sold Metails.com to Buy.com in 2004. In January 2006, Morgenstern was recruited to join Facebook as its third designer. At Facebook Jared would eventually lead the product teams working on Virtual Gifts, Usernames, Games, Social Ads, and the Like button among other projects.

In 2014 Jared joined Kleiner Perkins as an entrepreneur partner. In May 2014, he founded Chime out of his apartment in San Francisco.

References

External links
 Jared giving a TEDx talk in Tel Aviv, Israel
 Jared Morgenstern - האיש שהביא לנו את ה"לייק" בישראל — Jared discussing creating the Like button

1981 births
Living people
American bloggers
Web developers
American chief executives
American computer programmers
Facebook employees
American designers
People from Roslyn Heights, New York
20th-century American Jews
Harvard University alumni
Kleiner Perkins people
21st-century American Jews